Zabid (also spelled Zabīd, Zabeed and Zebid) is a town with an urban population of around 52,590 people on Yemen's western coastal plain. It is one of the oldest towns in Yemen, and has been a UNESCO World Heritage Site since 1993; though, in 2000, the site was placed on the List of World Heritage in Danger.

The Great Mosque of Zabid, also known as Al-Asha'ir Mosque, was built in 628 AD by Abu Musa Ashaari, one of the followers of Muhammad. The town was the capital of Yemen from the 13th to the 15th century.

History
The town, named after Wadi Zabid, the wadi (or valley) to its south, is one of the oldest towns in Yemen. Abu Musa Ashaari, one of the Prophet Muhammads companions, came originally from Zabid, and had the Great Mosque of the town built in 628 AD, also still during the Prophet's life. According to tradition, this is the 5th mosque built in the history of Islam. Another sahabi; Amru bin Ma'adi Yakrib also hailed from Zabid and was from the House of Zubaid, an Arabian tribe named after this city. Zabid was the capital of Yemen from the 13th to the 15th century and a centre of the Arab and Muslim world due in large part to its famed University of Zabid and being a centre of Islamic education. It was the capital of the Ziyadid dynasty from 819–1018 and the Najahid dynasty from 1022–1158.

In 1067, during the pilgrimage to Mecca, the Banu Najah clan under Sa'id Ibn Najah, the prince of Zabid, attacked the travel party of Ali and Asma bint Shihab, killed Ali and took Asma prisoner. She was sequestered in a secret prison in Zabid, and reportedly, the severed head of her spouse was planted on a pole visible from her cell. After a year's imprisonment, she managed to get a message through to her son and daughter-in-law in Sa'na, and her son stormed Zabid and freed her.

An Arab named Ali ibn Mahdi al-Himyari, native of the Yemeni Highlands, founded the Mahdid dynasty in Tihama. Ibn Mahdi and his followers burned down several districts north of Zabid. He had sworn to bring the Abyssinians back to slavery and ordered his men to kill everyone including the handicapped. Out of desperation, the people of Zabid sought assistance from the Zaydi imam Ahmed ibn Sulayman against al-Himyari. The Zaydi imam ordered Fatiq III to be executed on account of his alleged homosexuality. Fatiq III was either killed by the Imam, the Mahdids, or his own soldiers. With this event, the slave dynasty came an end and the Mahdids took over Zabid in 1158.

The troops of Ayyubid prince Turan Shah quickly overran the bulk of Yemen and took Zabid on 13 May 1174.

Hadım Suleiman Pasha extended Ottoman's authority to include Zabid in 1539. Zabid became the administrative headquarters of Yemen Eyalet.

Dawoodi Bohra dai Syedna Mohammad Ezzuddin also arrived in Zabeed with the intention of going to Hajj but the Zaidi had poisoned the drinking water in the ship and it had affected Syedna Ezzuddin. On knowing this he returned to Zabid immediately and died after few days. His mausoleum is also located in Zabid.

Today, however, Zabid is at the intellectual and economic margins of modern Yemen.

Geography
Zabid has an urban population of around 52,590 persons on Yemen's western coastal plain.

World Heritage Site
Zabid has been declared a World Heritage Site by UNESCO since 1993. Zabid's Great Mosque occupies a prominent place in the town. The vestiges of its university can also be visited.

In 2000, Zabid was listed on the List of World Heritage in Danger; the listing was made on the behest of the Yemeni government due to a state of poor upkeep and conservation.  According to a UNESCO report, roughly "40% of the city's houses have been replaced by concrete buildings, and other houses and the ancient souk are in a deteriorating state.  If the city has not begun preservation of its cultural heritage within two years of its inscription as a UNESCO World Heritage Site, it faces possible loss of this vaunted status.

Economy
As of 1920, Zabid was one of two places in Arabia growing indigo. Zabid also grows and produces cotton. The British cite tribal disputes as dampening the economy in Zabid during the early 20th century.

Gallery

References

External links

UNESCO World Heritage Site listing
Encyclopædia Britannica, Zabid

Populated places in Al Hudaydah Governorate
World Heritage Sites in Yemen
Arabic architecture
Archaeological sites in Yemen
World Heritage Sites in Danger